Luminosity is the total amount of energy radiated by an object per unit time.

Luminosity may also refer to:
Luminosity (scattering theory), the number of particles per unit area per unit time times the opacity of the target
Luminosity (yacht), an 107.6 meter hybrid yacht
Luminosity — Ignite the Night!, a former Cedar Point amusement park show that was shown from 2012 to 2017.
Luminosity function (astronomy), a function of the number of stars or galaxies per luminosity interval
Luminosity Gaming, an e-sports team

Other uses 
Luminance a measure of light, spectrally weighted per the Luminous efficiency function.
Luminous efficiency function, in colorimetry, the curve which defines the visual sensitivity of the human eye to light of different wavelengths. In the early 20th century this was briefly referred to as the luminosity function but that use was depreciated to avoid confusion with the term as used in astronomy.
Luminous flux

Games 
Luma (video) a gamma encoded signal of the luminance component of an image.
Lumosity, a series of brain training exercises
Lumino City, a puzzle game

See also
HSL color space